Tayeb Belaiz (born 21 August 1948) is an Algerian jurist and politician who held different cabinet posts. He served as Algeria's minister of justice between 2004 and 2012 and minister of interior between 2013 and 2015.

Early life and education
Belaiz was born in Maghnia on 21 August 1948. He holds a bachelor's degree in law.

Career
Belaiz served in various public posts before holding cabinet position, including presidential advisor, and court chair of Saida and Oran. He also worked as the president of the Algerian supreme court.

He served as the minister of employment and national solidarity in the cabinet formed by Prime Minister Ali Benflis in 2002. He was appointed as minister of justice in the cabinet headed by Prime Minister Ahmed Ouyahia in April 2004. He was reappointed as minister of justice in the cabinet of Prime Minister Abdelaziz Belkhadem on 25 May 2006.

While serving as minister of justice, Belaiz was also appointed as president of the constitutional council on 30 March 2012 and served in that post until September 2013. In a September 2013 reshuffle Belaiz was appointed as minister of interior in the cabinet led by Prime Minister Abdelmalek Sellal. Belaiz replaced Daho Ould Kablia in the post.

Belaiz was again named the head of the constitutional council in February 2019, and his second term ended in April 2019 when he resigned from the office.

References

21st-century Algerian politicians
1948 births
Algerian judges
Interior ministers of Algeria
Justice ministers of Algeria
Living people
People from Maghnia